Melittia aurociliata is a moth of the family Sesiidae. It is known from Namibia.

References

Endemic fauna of Namibia
Sesiidae
Insects of Namibia
Moths of Africa
Moths described in 1879